Hpakant jade mine disaster may refer to: 

2015 Hpakant jade mine disaster
April 2019 Hpakant jade mine collapse
July 2019 Hpakant jade mine collapse
2020 Hpakant jade mine disaster
2021 Hpakant jade mine disaster